The Columbia Years: The Definitive Anthology is a compilation by guitarist Dave Mason, released as a double-CD set in 2016. This album is a physical version of Columbia Records’ 2015 digital-only album The Essential Dave Mason.
 
The Columbia Years: The Definitive Anthology spans from 1973's It's Like You Never Left to 1980's Old Crest on a New Wave, including live cuts from Mason's career.

Track listing

References

Dave Mason albums
2016 greatest hits albums
Columbia Records albums